Primeiro de Maio is a Belo Horizonte Metro station on Line 1. It was opened in April 2002 as a one-station extension of the line from São Gabriel. In July 2002, the line was extended to Floramar. The station is located between São Gabriel and Waldomiro Lobo.

References

Belo Horizonte Metro stations
2002 establishments in Brazil
Railway stations opened in 2002